The morning glory Calystegia silvatica (syn. Calystegia sepium silvatica, C. inflata, and C. sylvestris) is known by the common name giant bindweed or large bindweed. It is the largest species of bindweed and is a strong rampant climber.

It is native to southern Europe but has been introduced to many other areas because it is an attractive garden plant. Calystegia silvatica subsp. fraterniflora (Mack. & Bush) Brummitt (short-stalked false bindweed) is native to North America.

It has large, arrow-shaped leaves and showy white trumpet-shaped flowers up to 9 centimeters in diameter. It is considered a weed in some areas where it has escaped cultivation and now grows wild. It spreads easily via hardy rhizomes. There are several subspecies.

References

External links
Flora of Northern Ireland
Weeds in New Zealand

silvatica
Flora of Southeastern Europe
Flora of Southwestern Europe
Plants described in 1844